House at 823 Ohio Street is a historic home located at Terre Haute, Vigo County, Indiana. It was built in 1880, and is a two-story, rectangular brick dwelling with Italianate and Queen Anne style design elements.  It features segmental arched windows and a rounded arch window with a wood sunburst surround.

It was listed on the National Register of Historic Places in 1983.

References

Houses on the National Register of Historic Places in Indiana
Italianate architecture in Indiana
Queen Anne architecture in Indiana
Houses completed in 1880
Buildings and structures in Terre Haute, Indiana
National Register of Historic Places in Terre Haute, Indiana